The AMA Motocross Championship (commercially known as Lucas Oil Pro Motocross) is an American motorcycle racing series. The motocross race series was founded and sanctioned by the American Motorcyclist Association (AMA) in 1972. The series is the major outdoor motocross series in the United States and is sanctioned by AMA Pro Racing and managed by MX Sports Pro Racing.

With respect to the MXGP holding the discipline's worldwide title, and the advent of the FIM Supercross World Championship resulting in the AMA Supercross Championship losing its world title status, the two series will form the SuperMotocross World Championship from 2023.

Series history
The series began in 1972 with the introduction of two classes based on 500 cc and 250 cc engine displacement formulas. A 125 cc class was added in 1974. As motocross technology developed, 500 cc two-stroke motocross bikes became too powerful for the average rider and, faced with diminishing numbers of competitors, the AMA discontinued the 500 cc class after the 1993 season. A women's national championship series was introduced in 1996.

Facing tightening federal emissions regulations in the United States, the A.M.A. increased the allowable displacement capacity for four-stroke engines in 1997, in an effort to encourage manufacturers to develop environmentally friendlier four-stroke machines. Due to the low relative power output of four-stroke engines, compared to the then-dominating two stroke design, the AMA had increased the allowable displacement capacity for four-strokes. By 1994, the displacement limit of a four-stroke power motocross bike was up to 550 cc in the 250 class, to incentivize manufactures to further develop the design for use in motocross.

In 2006, the 250 cc division was renamed the MX Class, with an engine formula allowing for 150–250 cc two-stroke or 250–450 cc four-stroke machines. The 125 cc class was renamed the MX Lites Class, allowing 0–125 cc two-stroke or 150–250 cc four-stroke engines. In 2009, the MX class was renamed the 450MX Class and the MX Lites Class was renamed the 250MX Class, to reflect the fact that all the competing manufacturers had adopted four-stroke machinery.

National champions

References:

Most wins by rider 

Source:

 Most Championships

 Most overall wins

Venues

Television Coverage

Current 
In 2023, there are three broadcast partners from the NBC family of networks: NBC, USA and Peacock.

Source:

AMA Supercross

In the 1970s promoters such as Bill France started bringing motocross races in from the country to stadiums within cities. Instead of being built upon natural terrain, dirt was imported into the stadiums where promoters tried to emulate the motocross tracks. In 1972 Mike Goodwin and Terry Tiernan, the president of the AMA, put on one of these stadium races in the Los Angeles Coliseum. The race was dubbed as the Super Bowl of Motocross. Eventually this form of racing evolved into its own sport and series with the name Supercross which was a shortening of the original "Super Bowl of Motocross". American motocross racing distinguished itself from European motocross by having two different season championships run each year for each class both sanctioned by the AMA. Currently the AMA runs their 17-round Supercross championship from the first weekend in January to the first weekend in May and then the 11-round outdoor Motocross championship from mid-May through late August.

Whereas AMA Motocross is two 30-minute plus 2 lap per each round with the winner being the rider with the highest combined points total for the two motos, in Supercross there is only one points-paying race per round. Around 40 riders qualify for each Supercross round. Heat races and LCQs are used to bring the field down to 22 riders for a points-paying main event for each round. A main event is 20 minutes plus 1 lap for the 450 class and 15 minutes plus 1 lap for the 250 class. There is no 250 Supercross national champion like there is for motocross. The 250 class in Supercross is split into East and West divisional rounds with an All Star race combining the top riders of each division at the final round in Las Vegas.

AMA Motocross and Supercross champions

Rookie season champions
 2021: Dylan Ferrandis claimed the 450 class Motocross championship in his rookie year.
 2010: Ryan Dungey became the only rider to capture both the Supercross and Motocross titles in his rookie year.
 1995: Mcgrath won the Supercross title as a rookie.

See also
 List of Trans-AMA motocross champions

Notes

References

External links
AMA Pro Racing official website
MX Sports Pro Racing official website

 
American Motorcyclist Association
Motocross
Motorcycle off-road racing series